Ellia English is an American singer, dancer, stage and film actress. She is best known for her role as Aunt Helen King on the comedy sitcom The Jamie Foxx Show which originally ran from 1996 to 2001, where she was featured in a central role and was paired onscreen with Garrett Morris, who played her husband Junior King. English also had recurring roles on Curb Your Enthusiasm, Good Luck Charlie, and Code Black.

Background
English was born in Covington, Georgia. After an early graduation from high school, English attended Clark College in Atlanta, in hopes of becoming a lawyer. However, when the head of the drama department overheard her singing and offered her one of the leading roles in their musical production, Ellia's life took a different turn. She later transferred to Georgia State University where she studied speech and drama, and soon became an ensemble player at the Alliance Theater. Thoroughly dedicated to a life of acting, the next step was to travel to New York City. There, English starred in such productions as Ain't Misbehavin''', Ma Rainey's Black Bottom, Colored Museum, Dreamgirls, Romeo and Juliet, Spunk, Show Boat, Barnum, Nunsense and One Mo' Time, to name a few. She also sang with the (New York) Community Choir as one of their solo recording artists.

Los Angeles was calling and English made the move. She was a series regular (as Helen King) on The Jamie Foxx Show. Other television credits include Martin, Sinbad, Empty Nest, The Five Mrs. Buchanans, Love & War, Get Smart, and Thea. She was featured in the made for television movies The Innocent, The Barefoot Executive, and Based on an Untrue Story.  On the silver screen, English was featured in Wildcats, Sidewalk Stories, Rain Without Thunder, Block Beauty and Girlfriends. She maintains a home in both Atlanta, Georgia and Los Angeles, California. She currently devotes her time to Big Sisters of Los Angeles and several other children's organizations. Also, in her spare time, she enjoys playing the flute, the piano, reading, walking, biking and many other outdoor activities. English is a member of Sigma Gamma Rho sorority. She co-stars with Steve Guttenberg and James Duval in the psycho horror film Cornered!, which is directed by Daniel Maze. She is also the winner of the 2009 New York Horror Film Festival's Best Actress Award for her portrayal of Mona in Cornered.

FilmographyWildcats (1984) as MarvaMatchups (2003) as Lynn WilliamsWoman Thou Art Loosed (2004) as Prison OfficialGood Luck Chuck (2007) as RebaSemi-Pro (2008) as QuincyCornered! (2009) as Mona
 "My Sister's Keeper" (2009) as Nurse Alice
Dance Flick – Woman on Train

Television
 2015–2018 : Code Black : Isabel Mendez (Recurring role)
 2011 : Wilfred (U.S. TV series) : Ruby (2 episodes)
2014 : Petals on the Wind (tv film) : Henny 
 2010–2014 : Good Luck Charlie : Mary Lou Wentz 
 2007–2009 : Curb Your Enthusiasm : Auntie Rae
 1996–2001 : The Jamie Foxx Show : Aunt Helen King (100 episodes)
 1994, 1996 : Martin : Mrs. Booker (3 episodes)
 1994 : The 5 Mrs. Buchanans (1 episode) : Social Worker
 1994 : The Innocent (TV) : Rev. Poppy
 1994 : The Sinbad Show (1 episode) : Receptionist aka Sinbad (UK) 
 1993 : Based on an Untrue Story) (TV) : Sister Love
 1989 : Great Performances (1 episode) : Queenie 
 1986 : Wildcats (Uncredited) : Marva aka First and Goal
 1982 : Fame (1 episode) : Sheila

Theatre
Love in the Nick of Tyme
Ain't Misbehavin'
Ma Rainey's Black Bottom
Colored Museum
Dreamgirls
Romeo and Juliet
Spunk
Show Boat
Barnum
Nunsense
One Mo' Time
Annie Warbucks

References

External links

Actresses from Georgia (U.S. state)
American musical theatre actresses
Living people
People from Covington, Georgia
African-American actresses
American television actresses
American film actresses
20th-century African-American women singers
21st-century African-American people
21st-century African-American women
Year of birth missing (living people)